Datti is a Hausa masculine name common in Nigeria.

Notable people with the name 

 Yusuf Datti Baba-Ahmed, Nigerian politician
 Mohammed Aliyu Datti, Nigerian footballer
 Datti Abubakar, Military Governor of Anambra state
 Abubakar Datti Yahaya, Nigerian judge

References